Under the constitutional doctrine of federal intervention, a federal interventor (also intervenor or intervener) has been appointed to govern Córdoba Province, Argentina, on several occasions. On some occasions the federal interventor was named Governor of Córdoba.

There are six series of interventors corresponding to the six federal interventions, each itself a product of a military coup d'état. These six coups d'état resulted in de facto governments.

1930–31 de facto military government

1943–46 de facto military government

1955–58 de facto military government

1962–63 de facto military government

1966–73 de facto military government

1976–83 de facto military government

Governors of Córdoba Province, Argentina